Dorthe Larsen  (born 8 August 1969) was a female Danish football goalkeeper. She was part of the Denmark women's national football team.

She competed at the 1996 Summer Olympics, playing 3 matches. On club level she played for Fortuna Hjørring. She played 396 matches for this club.

See also
 Denmark at the 1996 Summer Olympics

References

External links
 

Profile

1969 births
Living people
Danish women's footballers
Place of birth missing (living people)
Footballers at the 1996 Summer Olympics
Olympic footballers of Denmark
Women's association football goalkeepers
1995 FIFA Women's World Cup players
1999 FIFA Women's World Cup players
Denmark women's international footballers